Francis Point Provincial Park is a provincial park in British Columbia, Canada, located on the southwest end of the Francis Peninsula, south of the community of Pender Harbour on the west side of the Sechelt Peninsula in the Sunshine Coast region. Established in 2004, the park is 81 ha. in size, 72 ha. of it upland, the other 9 ha. foreshore.

See also
List of British Columbia provincial parks

References

BC Parks infopage

Provincial parks of British Columbia
Sunshine Coast (British Columbia)
2004 establishments in British Columbia
Protected areas established in 2004